David M. Leitner is an American chemist currently Professor at University of Nevada, Reno and an Elected Fellow of the American Association for the Advancement of Science.

Education
He earned his B.S. at Cornell University in 1985 and then his Ph.D at University of Chicago in 1989 under R. Stephen Berry.

Research
His interests are energy-molecule relations and his highest paper is An extended dynamical hydration shell around proteins, according to Google Scholar.

Publications

References

Year of birth missing (living people)
Living people
Fellows of the American Association for the Advancement of Science
University of Nevada, Reno faculty
21st-century American chemists
Cornell University alumni